Coran is an infrequently used English spelling of Qur'an (the main Islamic religious text).

It may also refer to:
Coran (river), a tributary of the Charente in France
Coran Capshaw, manager of the Dave Matthews Band
Coracholan languages, an alternative name for a language group within the Uto-Aztecan family, spoken in the Mexican states of Jalisco and Nayarit 
Coran the elf, a Baldur's Gate non-player character, voiced by Brian George
Circle Seven Koran, the holy scripture of the Moorish Science Temple of America
Coran, character of the Voltron TV-Series franchise.

See also
 Corran (disambiguation)